"Bring My Flowers Now" is a song by American country music singer Tanya Tucker. The song was written by Tucker with Brandi Carlile, Tim Hanseroth and Phil Hanseroth. It was released on August 16, 2019, as the fourth single from Tucker's twenty-fifth studio album While I'm Livin'. After 14 nominations throughout her career, the song earned Tucker her first Grammy Award. "Bring My Flowers Now" won Best Country Song in addition to being nominated for Best Country Solo Performance and the all-genre Grammy Award for Song of the Year. Rolling Stone placed the song at number 3 on their Best Country and Americana Songs of 2019 list, while Billboard ranked the song at number 27 on their list of the 35 Best Country Songs of the 2010s. The song peaked at number 47 on the Billboard Hot Country Songs chart.

Background
The songwriting process for "Bring My Flowers Now" began when Carlile suggested that Tucker finally finish the song she had been trying to write for 30 years. While Tucker was initially apprehensive about it, the track actually came about pretty easily. Tucker explained, "So I went into the restroom to think—I do my best thinking there—went back out, and [Brandi] was in the panel room. And we wrote this song in about 30 minutes. And then we walked in there to the vocal booth, and the band came in, and we recorded it." Tucker would later admit in interviews that she "would have liked to change a few things." She said that Carlile didn't want her to, saying that this album was about Tanya the singer, not Tanya the performer. Carlile told her, "This song sticks. This is what came out of your mouth, and that's the way we're gonna put it on there."

Accolades

Awards
The song received three nominations at the 62nd Annual Grammy Awards. "Bring My Flowers Now" won Best Country Song while also being nominated for Best Country Solo Performance and the all genre award for Song of the Year.

{| class="wikitable"
|-
! scope="col"| Award
! scope="col"| Year
! scope="col"| Category
! scope="col"| Result
|-
! scope = "row" rowspan = "3" | Grammy Awards
| rowspan = "3" | 2020
| Song of the Year
| 
|-
| Best Country Solo Performance
| 
|-
| Best Country Song
| 
|-
! scope = "row" | Americana Music Honors & Awards
| 2020
| Song of the Year
| 
|-
|-
! scope = "row" | CMT Music Awards
| 2020
| Video of the Year
| 
|-

Year-end lists
Rolling Stone placed "Bring My Flowers Now" at number three on their list of the 25 Best Country and Americana Songs of 2019.

Decade-end lists
Billboard ranked the song number 27 on their 35 Best Country Songs of the 2010s list.

Music video
The music video for "Bring My Flowers Now" was directed by Trey Fanjoy and released on October 22, 2019. Filmed entirely in black and white, the video depicts Tucker slowly riding horseback down a mostly deserted street with two young flower girls paving the way with flower petals. She encounters a few strangers along the way until she gets to the end of the street, where Brandi Carlile is playing piano. They tip their hats at each other and then Tucker rides off alone. It was filmed in Carthage, TN.

Track listing

Personnel
Adapted from the album liner notes.
Brandi Carlile – piano
Tanya Tucker – vocals

Charts

References

2019 songs
2019 singles
Tanya Tucker songs